Latil was a French automaker specializing in heavy duty vehicles, such as trucks, agricultural equipment, and buses, from 1898 to 1955. It had factories in Paris, Suresnes, and Marseille.

History
In 1897, Auguste Joseph Frederic Georges Latil (1878-1961) patented a constant-velocity joint, inspired by the knee's patella and which allowed wheels used for steering to also be used for driving, now known as front-wheel drive. This unit could be attached to the front of horse-drawn vehicles.

Latil and his friend, mechanic Aloïs Korn, started Korn and Latil Company in Marseille in 1898. Latil patented the design for the front-wheel drive and by the beginning of the 19th century was renting space in Levallois-Perret near Paris for a company arm called Avant-Train LATIL. In the summer of 1905, financier and polytechnician Charles Blum joined the team and the three opened the Compagnie Française de Mécanique et d'Automobile. Latil and his brother Lazare focused on company marketing while Blum and Korn handled the more technical side.

In 1911, the company moved into the niche of field artillery haulage, for which they created tractors with the layout of a truck. Latil also built the first four-wheel, all-terrain vehicle called the motorised artillery tractor (TAR), which he sold to the army to use along the Voie Sacrée during World War I to supply troops with 155mm guns. Civilians who purchased TARs could be given a 30% government subsidy given that their vehicles could be used by the military during warfare. After the war, small handling and hauling companies became the main customers of the TAR.

By 1914, demand of Latil's vehicles had increased substantially and they left the Levallois-Perret factories to move into a more spacious building in Suresnes. Five years later, Automobiles Industriels Latil - Charles Blum et Cie was founded and the team started building vans, trucks, and sweepers rather than front axles as automobile became more common.

In 1921, Latil earned a contract from the City of Paris for 100 vehicles to clean the streets and to remove the waste. The company built a garage in Paris by 1925 that could store 100 industrial vehicles that could be put on loan. Blum et Cie became a public limited company in 1928. By 1936, LATIL employed 1,200 people. In 1939, Georges Latil retired and moved to Nice following the death of his wife, and Blum took over as head of the company. During World War II, they collaborated with the munitions company MAP and sold tractors under the name MAP-Latil. LATIL planned to continue deeper into production of public administration vehicles, such as firetrucks and tipper trucks.

Mergers
In 1945, the Pons Plan reduced the number of vehicle manufacturers from 28 to seven and Latil was absorbed into the Peugeot Group. In 1955, the company, now called Automobiles Industriels LATIL, was merged with Somua to create Saviem, which was overseen by the CEO Pierre LeMaigre, a former CEO of LATIL. With the creation of Saviem, LATIL no longer existed, but Saviem and Société des Forges et Ateliers du Creusot - Usine Schneider came together to form the Société LATIL BATIGNOLLES, which exclusively manufactured and sold the LATIL TL tractor, the T4T articulated tractor, and ARMAX forklifts. This was the last time the name LATIL was used in the name of a related vehicle manufacturing company.

Vehicles

 Latil TA car (prod. 1897-1899)
 Latil M7 models (prod. 1898-1955): M7T1 artillery tractor, M7T1 light all-wheel vehicle, M7Z1 artillery tractor
 Korn et Latil car (prod. 1901-1902)
 Latil TP carrier tractor (1913-1921)
 Latil TAR models (1913-?): TAR 1917 artillery tractor, TAR 1920 carrier, TAR 1920 forest plateau, TAR H2 artillery tractor 
 Latil TL tractor (1921-?)
 TOURAND-LATIL plows
 LATIL type TL tractor
 11 HP van
 M2 A1 B3

See also
 Amiot (car manufacturer)

References 

Defunct motor vehicle manufacturers of France
Defunct truck manufacturers
Defunct bus manufacturers
Artillery tractors
Bus manufacturers of France
Truck manufacturers of France
French companies established in 1898
1898 establishments in France
1955 disestablishments in France
1955 mergers and acquisitions
Motor vehicle manufacturers of France
Fire service vehicle manufacturers
Construction equipment manufacturers of France
Military vehicle manufacturers
Manufacturing companies of France